David Davies, 1st Baron Davies  (11 May 1880 – 16 June 1944) was a Welsh Liberal politician and public benefactor who was MP for Montgomeryshire from 1906 to 1929. He was a grandson of the great Welsh industrialist David Davies. As a philanthropist, he established the King Edward VII Welsh National Memorial Association to combat tuberculosis in Wales, as well as the Wilson Chair of International Politics at the University College of Wales, Aberystwyth.

Early life and education
Davies was born in Llandinam, Montgomeryshire, the first child of Edward Davies and May Jones. His father was the only son of David Davies, often known as David Davies Llandinam, was the greatest Welsh industrialist of the Victorian era, having made his fortune in the coal mines.

He was educated at Merchiston Castle School and King's College, Cambridge, graduating in 1903. His family's wealth allowed the young Davies to travel extensively to exotic locations, where he enjoyed game hunting. He visited Africa, Asia and the United States, including Alaska. His two younger sisters, Gwendoline and Margaret, became renowned patrons of the arts.

Career

Politically and personally, Davies followed the lead set by his grandfather. In 1906, at just 26, he was elected the Liberal Member of Parliament for the Montgomeryshire constituency.

In the First World War, he commanded the 14th Battalion of the Royal Welsh Fusiliers until 1916, when he was appointed Parliamentary Secretary to David Lloyd George.

Following the war, Davies became an active supporter of the League of Nations. In 1929, Davies stood down prior to the general election to focus on international affairs.

Despite this, Davies continued to support the official Liberal Party. He became President of Montgomeryshire Liberal Association and was at odds with his successor as MP, Clement Davies. In 1931, Clement Davies became a Liberal National and continued to support the National Government after the official Liberal Party moved into opposition in 1933.

In 1932, he established the New Commonwealth Society for "the promotion of international law and order," writing several books on the right use of force, notably The Problem of the Twentieth Century (1930), which was translated into German and other languages.

His ideas influenced the writing of the United Nations Charter, especially with regards to sanctions and the transition of national armies to an international police.

On 24 June 1932, he was created Baron Davies of Llandinam, in the County of Montgomery, for public services.

In 1938, with a general election likely to occur in the near future, Lord Davies put pressure on Clement Davies by persuading the Montgomeryshire executive to seek clarification from their MP on his views regarding the National Government and appeasement. The MP shortly after avowedly opposed appeasement and resigned the Liberal National whip.

Philanthropy
Like his sisters, Davies was a significant philanthropist who donated to a number of good causes both locally and nationally. In 1910, he contributed £150,000 (£ as of ) to the King Edward VII Welsh National Memorial, which was formed with the aim of eradicating tuberculosis in Wales.

He endowed perhaps the world's first Chair in International Politics, established in honour of Woodrow Wilson in 1919 at the University College of Wales, Aberystwyth, which also hosts the David Davies Memorial Institute of International Studies. He was also the president of the National Library of Wales.

The Welsh Temple of Peace in Cardiff was his brainchild, and was funded by Davies, to a great extent, pledging £58,000 in 1934 (equivalent to £ million in ) towards the erection of a building.

Family and issue
In 1910, Davies married his first wife Amy Penman, daughter of Lancelot Tulip Penman of Broadwood Park, and had two children:
 Maj. David Michael Davies, 2nd Baron Davies (16 January 1915 – 25 September 1944) married Ruth Eldrydd Dugdale, daughter of Maj. William Marshall Dugdale, and had two sons
 Marguerite Elizabeth (26 April 1917 – 18 December 1930)

Four years after Amy's death in 1918, he remarried to Henrietta Margaret Fergusson, daughter of James Grant Fergusson of Baledmund, Perthshire, and had four more children:

Hon. Edward Davies (30 January 1925 – 26 October 1997)
Hon. Islwyn Edmund Evan Davies  (10 December 1926 – 5 October 2002)
Hon. Mary Myfanwy (20 November 1923 – 21 September 2001)
Hon. Gwendoline Rita Jean Davis Cormack (1 May 1929 – 4 June 2011)

In 1944, while launching a new X-Ray mobile scanning unit at Sully Hospital (which the Temple of Peace in Cardiff had funded), Davies volunteered to undergo the first routine chest scan. The scan revealed advanced cancer from which he died from a few months later in June 1944.

His eldest son and heir, Major Hon. David Michael Davies, was serving in the Royal Welsh Fusiliers when he was killed in action in September 1944, only a few months after inheriting the title. The latter's eldest son succeeded as the third Baron Davies, days prior to his fourth birthday.

A statue commissioned in honour of his Grandfather stands in Llandinam in Powys on the A470. The Llandinam Building at Aberystwyth University was named in his honour.

Arms

References

Further reading
 Biography of Davies by K. O. Morgan, Oxford Dictionary of National Biography, Oxford, 2004
  (Thomas Jones guided Davies and his sisters on numerous philanthropic social projects, including the tuberculosis campaign)

External links

 
Article about Davies by Dr J Graham Jones in Journal of Liberal History, Issue 29, Winter 2000-01

 

Davies, David, 1st Baron
Davies, David, 1st Baron
Liberal Party (UK) MPs for Welsh constituencies
UK MPs 1906–1910
UK MPs 1910
UK MPs 1910–1918
UK MPs 1918–1922
UK MPs 1922–1923
UK MPs 1923–1924
UK MPs 1924–1929
UK MPs who were granted peerages
Parliamentary Private Secretaries to the Prime Minister
Davies, David, 1st Baron
Alumni of King's College, Cambridge
People educated at Merchiston Castle School
People from Montgomeryshire
Barons in the Peerage of the United Kingdom
Fellows of the Royal Geographical Society
20th-century British philanthropists
National Liberal Party (UK, 1931) politicians
Barons created by George V